Jens Einar Müller (30 November 1917 – 30 March 1999) was a Norwegian pilot trained in Little Norway in Canada and a prisoner of war in the German POW camp Stalag Luft III. He was one of only three men to escape to freedom in the "Great Escape".

Early life
Müller was born in Shanghai, China, the son of Norwegian engineer Einar Jønsberg Müller (1872–1943) and British actress Daisy Constance Russell (1891–1978). Jens Müller had one brother, the Norwegian movie director Nils R. Müller. The brothers grew up in Aker, Norway. Müller had already received a pilot's license at age eighteen in 1935. Müller was studying in Zurich when World War II broke out. In May 1940 he arrived in England.

Career
By 1942 he was an officer in 331 (Norwegian) Squadron at North Weald in England. On 19 June 1942, after completing a so-called "Roadsted" mission, his Spitfire Mark V (tail number AR298) was shot down by a German Focke-Wulf Fw 190 just off the Belgian coast after running out of ammunition. He escaped the plane by parachute and managed to paddle ashore unseen in his inflatable dinghy after 66 hours. However, he was caught by a German sentry almost immediately.

In what later became known as the "Great Escape" in march 1944, which Müller had contributed to by constructing an air pump for ventilation of the tunnel, he was escapee #43 among the 76 prisoners of war who managed to escape from the camp (now: in Żagań, Poland). Müller partnered with a fellow Norwegian pilot, Per Bergsland, for their escape attempt.

The pair caught a train to Stettin in Germany (now: Szczecin, Poland), where they intended to meet one of Roger Bushell's contacts in a local brothel. However, while there, they made contact with a Swede who offered to aid their escape, telling them to wait down at a pier in the harbour. After some time they realized the ship had left. They spent half the night in a boxcar, slept the next at an inn, and on returning to the harbour the next evening, met two Swedish sailors who helped smuggle them past the harbour authorities.

The ship arrived in Gothenburg, where the two Norwegian pilots quickly sought out the British consulate. They were sent by train to Stockholm and were flown to Scotland from Bromma airport. From there they were sent by train to London and shortly afterwards to 'Little Norway' in Canada where they both resumed service, this time as flight instructors.

Out of the 76 POWs who escaped, only three managed to reach neutral countries and freedom. The third successful escapee was the Dutchman Bram van der Stok, who crossed most of occupied Europe and escaped to Spain with the help of the French resistance.

The remaining 73 escapees were recaptured. Adolf Hitler wanted to have them all shot, but Heinrich Himmler (or possibly Hermann Göring) persuaded him not to do this. Instead, fifty of the escapees were executed to make an example. This was a serious breach of the Geneva Convention which constituted a war crime. The remaining 23 recaptured prisoners were held in the custody of the Gestapo before being sent off to other camps. Of these, 17 were returned to Stalag Luft III, four were sent to Sachsenhausen, and two to Colditz Castle.

After the war, Müller worked for Det Norske Luftfartsselskap (DNL), one of the companies that merged into Scandinavian Airlines System. He retired in 1977.

He was married and resided in Rykkinn. He died in April 1999.

Legacy 
Jens Müller wrote a book about his war time experiences titled Tre kom tilbake (English: Three Returned) (Gyldendal, 1946). The Great Escape was made into a film. In February 2019 the first English language edition of Müller's memoir was published in English with an introduction by the Norwegian historian Asgeir Ueland and a preface by Jens Müller's son Jon Muller.

References

Related reading
Carroll, Tim (2004) The Great Escaper (Mainstream Publishing) 
Brickhill, Paul (1950) The Great Escape (W. W. Norton & Company) 
Burgess, Alan (1990) The Longest Tunnel (Bloomsbury Publishing) 
Durand, Arthur A (1989) Stalag Luft III (Patrick Stephens Ltd) 
Muller, Jens (2019) Escape from Stalag Luft III: The Memoir of Jens Muller (Greenhill Books) 
Nerdrum, Johan (1986) Fugl fønix: En beretning om Det Norske Luftfartselskap (Gyldendal) 

1917 births
1999 deaths
Norwegian people of British descent
People from Akershus
Norwegian Army Air Service personnel of World War II
Norwegian World War II pilots
Norwegian Royal Air Force pilots of World War II
World War II prisoners of war held by Germany
Participants in the Great Escape from Stalag Luft III
Norwegian prisoners of war in World War II
Norwegian escapees
Norwegian expatriates in Switzerland
Norwegian expatriates in Canada
Shot-down aviators